Topps Meat Company (Topps Meat Company LLC) was a privately owned family company founded in 1940 by Benjamin Sachs in Manhattan, New York. The company later relocated to Elizabeth, New Jersey. The company produced and distributed frozen ground beef patties and other meat products processed at its  plant in Elizabeth and posted about $8.8 million a year in sales, according to information reported by Dun & Bradstreet. In 2003, the company was purchased by Strategic Investment and Holdings, an investment firm based in Buffalo, New York and by 2007 it was "one of the country’s largest manufacturers of frozen hamburgers." In 2007 the company ceased operations following Escherichia coli O157:H7 (E. coli) contamination of products and the ensuing recall.

Ownership
According to the New York Times:
"Topps opened in 1940 in Manhattan. The founder, Benjamin Sachs, later sold the company to his son, Steven Sachs, according to Ann Sachs, the founder’s former daughter-in-law. A few years before the company moved to New Jersey, Joseph D’Urso became vice president. After Mr. D’Urso died in 2003, the company was bought by Strategic Investment and Holdings."

Timeline
1940 - Founded
2003 - Purchased by Strategic Investment and Holdings
2005 
USDA found that the plant had received meat tainted with E. coli
Topps settled a $1.7 million accidental arm amputation lawsuit
Topps was sued after a consumer became ill from eating a Topps hamburger.
2007
July 5 - first illness linked to recall
July 8 - second illness case 
September 7 - USDA's first positive test results for E. coli contamination
September 25 - initial recall of 331,582 pounds of frozen hamburger patties
September 29 - with additional evidence of "inadequate sanitation and process controls" and 25 illnesses under investigation in eight states, the USDA expanded the recall to a total of 21.7 million pounds of Topps beef.
October 4 - class-action lawsuit filed
October 4 - USDA's "notice of intended enforcement"
October 5, 2:35 pm - Topps Meat ceases operations

Controversy
21.7 million pounds of frozen ground beef products produced between September 25, 2006, and September 25, 2007, by the Topps Meat Company were recalled in September 2007 due to Escherichia coli O157:H7 contamination concerns. At the time, this was the second-largest beef recall in U.S. history, after Hudson Foods Company's recall of 25 million pounds of ground beef in 1997.
Product samples subsequently tested positive for contamination with E. coli.
The first reported case of illness linked to the contamination occurred on July 5, 2007.

On October 4, 2007, a class-action lawsuit was filed against Topps Meat over the contaminated meat and its consequences.
Also on October 4, 2007, the USDA served Topps Meat with a "notice of intended enforcement" (which is a move just short of suspending the rest of the company’s meat production) because of "inadequate process controls" also in the company’s non-ground beef production processes. On October 5, 2007, Topps Meat ceased operations; 77 workers were laid off while about 10 others remained employed to assist the USDA's investigation.

"In one week we have gone from the largest U.S. manufacturer of frozen hamburgers to a company that cannot overcome the economic reality of a recall this large," Anthony D'Urso, chief operating officer, said in a statement.

USDA's first positive test results for E. coli contamination came back September 7, 2007, but they waited for confirming tests before ordering a recall 18 days later. Criticism of that 18-day delay in seeking the recall of millions of pounds of tainted Topps Meat ground beef caused the USDA to promise to speed up warnings about contaminated meat in the future.

As of October 7, 2007, 29 people in eight states had fallen ill after consuming hamburgers made by Topps Meat Co.

See also
List of United States foodborne illness outbreaks

Sources and notes

External links
Topps Meat Company home page, from Internet Archive copy as of May 19, 2006

Defunct agriculture companies of the United States
Companies based in Union County, New Jersey
Food manufacturers of the United States
American companies established in 1940
Food recalls
Companies disestablished in 2007
Defunct manufacturing companies based in New Jersey
History of Elizabeth, New Jersey
Meat companies of the United States
Food and drink companies established in 1940